Tim Johnston may refer to:
Tim Johnston (businessman), Australian businessman
Tim Johnston (athlete) (1941–2021), British long-distance runner
Tim Johnston (cricketer) (born 1990), New Zealand cricketer
Tim Johnston (writer), author anthologised in Children Playing Before a Statue of Hercules, 2005
Tim Johnston, contestant in the seventh season of Australian Idol in 2009

See also
Timothy Johnson (disambiguation), including Tim Johnson